Batang is a rural town in Ningxiang City, Hunan Province, China. It is surrounded by Zifu on the west, Huilongpu Town and Baimaqiao Subdistrict on the north, Xiaduopu Town on the east, and Huaminglou Town on the south. Nantianping township merged to Batang town on November 19, 2015.

Administrative division
The town is divided into 13 villages and one community: 
 Batang Community
 Yanjiang
 Le'an
 Jinzhou
 Weiwu
 Bao'an
 Jinhe
 Youmatian
 Fanrong
 Nantianping 
 Nanfentang 
 Yangxitang 
 Hengtianwan 
 Tingzhongxin

Geography
The Wu River, a tributary of the Wei River  known as "Mother River" and a tributary of the Xiang River, flows through the town.

The town has four reservoirs: Shiniu Reservoir, Dongchong Reservoir, Huaguang Reservoir and Wenjiachong Reservoir.

Economy
The region abounds with manganese.

Peach, prunus mume and tobacco are important to the economy.

Education
There is one senior high school located with the town limits: Ningxiang Second Senior High School.

Culture
Huaguxi is the most influence local theater.

Transport
The County Road X096 runs south to north through the town.

The County Road X093 travels southeast to Huaminglou Town, intersecting Provincial Highway S208.

Attractions
On 16December 2011, local people discovered 128 bridges built during the reign of the Qianlong Emperor (r. 17351796).

References

External links
 

Divisions of Ningxiang
Ningxiang